Barvanan may refer to:
 Barvanan-e Gharbi Rural District
 Barvanan-e Markazi Rural District
 Barvanan-e Sharqi Rural District